Radan Šunjevarić (Serbian Cyrillic: Радан Шуњеварић; born 10 February 1983) is a Serbian professional footballer who plays as a defensive midfielder for Jedinstvo Užice.

Career
Šunjevarić spent almost ten seasons at Sevojno, before the club merged with Sloboda Užice in 2010. He also played for Novi Pazar, before moving to Sarajevo in June 2012. In the summer of 2013, Šunjevarić returned to his homeland and signed with Borac Čačak.

Honours
Sevojno
 Serbian Cup: Runner-up 2008–09

References

External links
 Srbijafudbal profile 
 
 

Association football midfielders
Expatriate footballers in Bosnia and Herzegovina
FK Borac Čačak players
FK Jedinstvo Užice players
FK Novi Pazar players
FK Sarajevo players
FK Sevojno players
FK Sloboda Užice players
Serbian expatriate footballers
Serbian expatriate sportspeople in Bosnia and Herzegovina
Serbian First League players
Serbian footballers
Serbian SuperLiga players
Sportspeople from Užice
1983 births
Living people